Nueva Vanguardia Estudiantes de Murcia Club de Fútbol, known as Estudiantes de Murcia, is a Spanish football club based in Murcia. Founded in 2016, it is the reserve team of FC Jumilla, and it plays in Tercera División – Group 13, holding home games at Polideportivo Municipal Ángel Sornichero in Alcantarilla, with a capacity of 400 spectators.

History
Estudiantes' origins trace back to 1964 with the foundation of Nueva Vanguardia CF (a club mainly dedicated to the youth categories), which merged with Espinardo Atlético (founded in 2013 and playing that season under the name of Sporting de Murcia CF) in August 2015, to become CF Espinardo Atlético Nueva Vanguardia. Both clubs also absorbed Club Edeco PMD Fortuna, taking their place in Tercera División. 

In July 2016, the club became FC Jumilla's reserve team, being renamed Nueva Vanguardia Estudiantes de Murcia Club de Fútbol. In the following year, the club changed name to Estudiantes CF and ended their partnership with Jumilla, but as the agreement was reinstated in June 2018, the club changed back to its previous name.

Club background
Espinardo Atlético - (2013–2015) → ↓
Club de Fútbol Espinardo Atlético Nueva Vanguardia - (2015–2016) →↓
Nueva Vanguardia Estudiantes de Murcia Club de Fútbol - (2016–present)
Club de Fútbol Nueva Vanguardia - (1964–2015) → ↑
Club Edeco PMD Fortuna - (1987–2015) → ↑

Season to season

CF Nueva Vanguardia

Edeco PMD Fortuna

6 seasons in Tercera División

Espinardo Atlético

1 season in Tercera División

Estudiantes de Murcia CF

3 seasons in Tercera División

References

External links
La Preferente team profile 

Football clubs in the Region of Murcia
Association football clubs established in 2016
2016 establishments in Spain
Sport in Murcia